V-set and immunoglobulin domain containing 4 is a protein that in humans is encoded by the VSIG4 gene.

Function

This gene encodes a v-set and immunoglobulin-domain containing protein that is structurally related to the B7 family of immune regulatory proteins. The encoded protein may be a negative regulator of T-cell responses. This protein is also a receptor for the complement component 3 fragments C3b and iC3b. Alternate splicing results in multiple transcript variants.

References

Further reading